Harry Ritchie (born 1958) is a Scottish writer and journalist. He is the author of six books, and numerous newspaper articles and book reviews.

Biography 
Ritchie was born in Kirkcaldy, Fife. He attended Kirkcaldy High School and the University of Edinburgh, then studied for a D.Phil. at Lincoln College, Oxford. His doctoral thesis on the literary scene of the 1950s was published by Faber as the book Success Stories in 1988. His subsequent works are the comic travel books Here We Go  and The Last Pink Bits, the novels Friday Night Club and The Third Party, and a book about English grammar, English for the Natives (John Murray).

Ritchie edited the anthology New Scottish Writing, and contributed an essay to Nick Hornby's anthology of football writing, My Favourite Year, about his lifelong passion for Raith Rovers, his hometown football club.

Ritchie lives in London with the journalist and broadcaster Tracey MacLeod.

References

1958 births
Living people
People from Kirkcaldy
Scottish journalists
People educated at Kirkcaldy High School
Alumni of the University of Edinburgh
Alumni of Lincoln College, Oxford